Mike Fleming (23 February 1928 – 1994) was a footballer who played for as inside forward for Tranmere Rovers and Buxton. He also appeared for Mossley in the 1959–60 season, scoring three goals in 38 games.

References

1928 births
1994 deaths
Association football inside forwards
Tranmere Rovers F.C. players
Buxton F.C. players
English Football League players
English footballers
Mossley A.F.C. players